Catharine R. Stimpson (born June 4, 1936 in Bellingham, Washington) is a feminist scholar, University Professor, professor of English, and dean emerita of the Graduate School of Arts and Science at New York University.

Academic career
Stimpson did her undergraduate studies at Bryn Mawr College and earned graduate degrees from Cambridge University and Columbia University. She was the founding editor in 1975 of Signs: Journal of Women in Culture and Society.

Stimpson began her academic career at Barnard College, where she was founding director of the Barnard Center for Research on Women in 1971. In 1980, she became Professor of English at Rutgers University, where she also led the Institute for Research on Women, was Dean of the Graduate School and Vice Provost for Graduate Education, and University Professor. After a leave from Rutgers to serve as Director of the MacArthur Fellows Program, she became University Professor and Dean of the Graduate School of Arts and Sciences at New York University in 1998. In 2010, she became Dean Emerita at NYU, where she has appointments in the Department of English, the Steinhardt Institute for Higher Education Policy, and the Law School.

In 1990, she was president of the Modern Language Association and in 1999-2000 she was president of the Association of Graduate Schools of the Association of American Universities.

MacArthur Fellows
As director of the MacArthur Fellows Program from 1993 to 1997, Stimpson helped the program move from recognizing already established scholars to the more contemporary form of today.

Bibliography
In addition to being the founding editor of Signs, Stimpson has written two books, edited seven books, and published over 150 monographs, essays, stories, and reviews.

References

1936 births
Living people
People from Bellingham, Washington
Feminist studies scholars
Bryn Mawr College alumni
Columbia University alumni
Barnard College faculty
Alumni of the University of Cambridge
Rutgers University faculty
New York University faculty
Presidents of the Modern Language Association